Jan Kolář may refer to:

Jan Kolář (ice hockey, born 1981), Czech ice hockey player
Jan Kolář (ice hockey, born 1986), Czech ice hockey player
Ján Kollár (1793–1852), Slovak writer